Chig may refer to:

 Chig, a member of the fictional species called Chigs in the science fiction series Space: Above and Beyond
 Chig Township (འགྲིགས་, 直克乡), Kamba County, Tibet Autonomous Region, China
 Chig Well, the forest (weil) of Chig, former Anglo-Saxon name for Chigwell
 chig, Tasmanian dialect variant for the term Bogan